I Can't Go On This Way is a Tyrone Davis album released in 1978. This was his third Columbia Records release.

Singles

Two singles were released. The lead single, "Get On Up (Disco)", reached No. 12 on the Billboard Hot Soul Singles chart, while the follow up, "Can't Help But Say", peaked at No. 65 on the same chart.

Track listing
"Get On Up Disco" - 9:58
"All I Ever Need" - 4:29
"Bunky" - 5:06
"I Can't Go On This Way" - 4:39
"Can't Help But Say" - 4:10
"It's You It's You" - 3:13
"I'm Still in Love With You" - 3:29
"Do You Feel It" - 4:58

Personnel

 Tyrone Davis – lead vocals
 Tennyson Stephens – keyboards
 Bernard Reed – bass
 Danny Leake, John Bishop, Melvin Taylor – guitar
 Quinton Joseph – drums, percussion
 Henry Gibson – congas, bongos
 Gloria Graham, The Haywood Singers, Wales Wallace – backing vocals
 Cliff Davis, Fred Entesari, Ronald Wilson, Steele Seals, Willie Henderson – saxophone
 John Avent, Morris Ellie, Steve Berry – trombone
 Clyde Bordelon, Elmer Brown, Murray Watson, Norval Hodges – trumpet
 James Mack, Kaye Clement – flute
 Carol Stephenson – oboe
 Aventine Calvetti – strings [bass]
 Bobby Christian – vibraphone
 Elaine Mack, Kenneth Slowik, Robert Guastafeste – cello
 Gail Williams, Maurice Grice, Thomas Still, William Klingelhoffer – French horn
 Gerasim Warutian, Lee Lene, Solomonov Rami* – viola
 Barbara Breckman, Christine Haarvig, Danny Burgess, Deborah Miller, Edward Green, Edmund Baurer*, Elaine Fohrman, Faye Christensen, Mark Feldman, Philip Hilson, Roger James, Sallie LeVerenz, Virginia Graham – violins

Charts

References

External links
 

1978 albums
Tyrone Davis albums
Columbia Records albums
Albums produced by Leo Graham (songwriter)